Donato Anthony Montanaro Jr. is a private investor and the founder of two stockbrokerages.

Early life and education
Montanaro received a Bachelor of Arts from University of Notre Dame, where, in 1987, he was student body vice president and was found guilty of plagiarism. He received a Juris Doctor from Columbus School of Law at Catholic University of America.

Career
From 1992 to 1997, Montanaro was a stockbroker at Quick & Reilly.

In 1997, Montanaro founded Suretrade.

In 2005, he founded Tradeking.

In 2016, Tradeking was acquired by Ally Financial.

References

American computer businesspeople
Living people
Year of birth missing (living people)